Montes Recti is a mountain range on the northern part of the Moon's near side. It was given the Latin name for "Straight Range". The name was approved in 1961 by the International Astronomical Union (IAU).

This is a small range of irregular ridges that is located in the northern part of the Mare Imbrium. Montes Recti is an unusually linear formation that forms a line from east to west. It is about 90 km in length, and only 20 km wide. The peaks rise to heights of up to 1.8 km.

The small crater Montes Recti B lies in the eastern part of the range. To the west are the Montes Jura and to the east are the Montes Teneriffe.

References

Recti, Montes